Valamis Group Ltd. is a Finnish enterprise software company headquartered in Joensuu, Finland. It is the developer of Valamis, an e-learning software used by enterprises and universities for online learning.

History 
Arcusys was founded on December 18, 2003, by Jussi Hurskainen, Mika Kuikka, Kyösti Nevalainen and Mikko Taivainen. In the early years, Valamis' main business was working as a subcontractor for large manufacturing corporations. When the technology development took off within the company in 2007, Valamis started work with universities.

In 2012, Arcusys acquired the software company Fudeco Ltd and expanded its offices to Oulu, Finland.

In 2016, the company acquired the predictive analytics company Olapcon Ltd.

In May 2018, Arcusys changed its name to Valamis.

In January 2019, Valamis acquired the software company Componence Services B.V. and opened an office in Amsterdam.

In December 2020, Valamis was acquired by Adelis Equity Partners. Adelis acquired shares from the passive shareholders and invested growth equity in the company through a private offering.

In July 2021, Valamis acquired the digital learning management software company The Working Manager Limited (TWM).

References

Educational software companies
Software companies of Finland
Multinational companies headquartered in Finland